Huancahuari is a surname, and may refer to;

Huancahuari derives from huanca which means rock in Quechua or in reference to Huanca people and huari which means vicuña or in reference to the Huari people.

Juana Huancahuari - Peruvian politician
Pánfilo Amilcar Huancahuari Tueros - mayor of Ayacucho from 2010-2014

Quechuan-language surnames